William Mosiello (born July 14, 1964) is a baseball coach and former catcher, who is the current head baseball coach of the Ohio State Buckeyes. He played college baseball at Cerritos College from 1984 to 1985 before transferring to Fresno State where he played in 1986.

Playing career 
Mosiello went to Cerritos High School in Cerritos, California, where he played catcher. Mosiello redshirted the 1983 season at Fresno State. He then transferred and played at Cerritos College. As a Freshman, Mosiello was named the most inspirational player for the Falcons. He was named second team All-South Coast Conference as a sophomore. Mosiello then returned to Fresno State, where he lettered in 1986.

Coaching career 
Mosiello began his coaching career in 1987, returning to Cerritos as their hitting coach. He would join the staff at Cal State Fullerton from 1991 to 1992. 1993, saw him take the hitting coach position with the Tennessee Volunteers. While an assistant coach at Oklahoma, Mosiello abruptly quit 23 games into the 2001 season after being told to temper his intensity.

In 2004, Mosiello was manager of the Battle Creek Yankees. The Yankees moved him to the Charleston RiverDogs in 2005, where the RiverDogs best first half record allowed him to manage the South Atlantic League's South Division All Stars.

Mosiello joined Chad Kreuter's staff as the hitting coach of the USC Trojans in 2007. After a single season, he left the Trojans to join the Auburn Tigers.

While managing the Arkansas Travelers during the 2011 season, Mosiello abruptly resigned to return to the college game, as well as Tennessee in 2011, as the team's hitting coach.

In the summer of 2013, Mosiello joined Jim Schlossnagle's staff at TCU. His longest coaching stay came at TCU, where he helped lead the Horned Frogs to seven NCAA tournaments and four College World Series from 2014 to 2022.

On June 16, 2022, Mosiello was named the head coach at Ohio State, his first head coaching position at the Division I level in his lengthy coaching career.

Head coaching record

Personal life 
Mosiello and his wife, Janelle, have three sons: Shane, Gehrig and Helton.

References

External links 

Ohio State Buckeyes bio

1964 births
Living people
Arizona State Sun Devils baseball coaches
Auburn Tigers baseball coaches
Cal State Fullerton Titans baseball coaches
Cerritos Falcons baseball coaches
Cerritos Falcons baseball players
Fresno State Bulldogs baseball coaches
Ohio State Buckeyes baseball coaches
Oklahoma Sooners baseball coaches
Ole Miss Rebels baseball coaches
USC Trojans baseball coaches
TCU Horned Frogs baseball coaches
Tennessee Volunteers baseball coaches
Minor league baseball managers